Pope Clement III (1130 – 20 March 1191), was the head of the Catholic Church and ruler of the Papal States from 19 December 1187 to his death in 1191. He ended the conflict between the Papacy and the city of Rome, by allowing the election of magistrates, which reinstalled the Papacy back in the city after a six year exile. Clement, faced with a deplete college of cardinals, created thirty-one cardinals over three years, the most since Hadrian IV. He died 20 March 1191 and was quickly replaced by Celestine III.

Family 
Paolo Scolari was born into an influential family growing in significance in Rome during the twelfth century. Pope Alexander III appointed him archpriest of the patriarchal Liberian Basilica, cardinal-deacon of Sergio e Bacco, and finally cardinal bishop of Palestrina in December 1180.

Papacy

Election 
Paolo was elected as the new Pope on December 19, 1187, two days after the death of Gregory VIII. He was the cardinals' second choice, but their first choice, cardinal Theobald of Ostia, refused the papal throne. Clement was the second Roman pope since Innocent II.

Two months before being elected pope, Paoloa Scolari had been rejected as a papal candidate by the cardinals due to being in poor health. Even during his office as pope his health was a cause of concern. An instance of his poor health was six months after he was elected in June 1188 the cardinals thought Clement was going to die and had pope-elect Cardinal Bishop Teobald of Ostia on hand for when Clement died. Though Clement was old and ill, he was still elected as pope and could have something to do with the small number of cardinals, only eight Cardinals and three of them having been known Romans, at the election of Clement. The electors of Clement may have been aiming for the possibility of returning the curia to Rome, which would in fact happen during his time as pope.

Time as Pope 
Shortly after his accession at the conclusion of the papal election of December 1187, Clement succeeded in allaying the conflict which had existed for half a century between the popes and the citizens of Rome, with an agreement by which the citizens were allowed to elect their magistrates, while the nomination of the governor of the city remained in the hands of the pope. In March of 1188 Clement III had agreed that the Roman Church would reimburse numerous Roman citizens who have not received any beneficia since Pope Lucius III, a probable cause of the conflict between the pope and Romans. On 31 May 1188 he concluded a treaty with the Romans which removed long standing difficulties, thus returning the papacy to Rome.

Clement also inherited a depleted college of cardinals, consisting of no more than twenty cardinals. He orchestrated three series of promotions (March 1188, May 1189 and October 1190) that resulted in thirty-one cardinals. This number of cardinals had not been seen since 1159, under Hadrian IV. During Clement's papacy, the majority of cardinals were Romans, possibly due to Clement III being Roman as well and wanting to fill the Church with Romans.

Actions 
Clement sent the Archbishop of Tyre, Josias, to persuade King Henry II of England and King Philip II of France to undertake the Third Crusade. 

The relationship of Romans and Sicily had been turbulent and the Romans were increasingly becoming mad at the pope before 1188 which had led to two rival factions in the college of cardinals, with one faction becoming closer to forming an alliance with the king of Sicily, and the other side wanting reconciliation with the emperor.

In April 1189, Clement ended the conflict with Frederick I Barbarossa. In spite of agreeing to crown Henry VI as Holy Roman Emperor, Clement III angered him by bestowing Sicily on Tancred, son of Roger III, Duke of Apulia. The crisis was acute when the Pope died in the latter part of March 1191.

Clement, after Alexander III prohibited supplying military information and material to Muslims, had a series of decretals increased the banned items people would be allowed to trade and called for an embargo with the Islamic world.

Clement settled a controversy with King William I of Scotland concerning the choice of the archbishop of St Andrews, and on 13 March 1188 removed the Scottish church from the legatine jurisdiction of the Archbishop of York, thus making it independent of all save Rome.

Death 
Clement died on 10 April 1191, Celestine III who was 85, was elected the day of Clements death unanimously. Celestine was not involved with either of the sides or factions that were the 'imperialists' nor the 'Sicilians'.

See also

List of popes
Cardinals created by Clement III

References

Sources

Attribution:

Further reading
 

Popes
Italian popes
Cardinal-bishops of Palestrina
Cardinals created by Pope Alexander III
12th-century Italian cardinals
1130 births
1191 deaths
12th-century popes
12th-century Italian Roman Catholic bishops
Burials at the Archbasilica of Saint John Lateran